QuickBBS (QBBS) was a bulletin board system (BBS) application first introduced for MS-DOS by Adam Hudson.

Features
Messaging

Multi-User Login

Doors

Games

File Transfer

Multi-user interaction

Low Memory Overhead
Written in Borland Turbo Pascal

Other BBS Software Programs 
RBBS-PC 
FidoBBS / FidoNET

References

External links
Install Disks Download
QuickBBS Utilities at The BBS Archive

Bulletin board system software
DOS software